Amin is a 2018 French drama film directed by Philippe Faucon. It was selected to screen in the Directors' Fortnight section at the 2018 Cannes Film Festival.

Cast
 Moustapha Mbengue : Amin Sow
 Emmanuelle Devos : Gabrielle
 Mareme N'Diaye : Aïcha
 Noureddine Benallouche : Abdelaziz
 Moustapha Naham : Ousmane
 Jalal Quarriwa : Sabri
 Émilie Gavois-Kahn : The director
 Ouidad Elma : Selima
 Fantine Harduin : Célia
 Loubna Abidar : The waitress

References

External links
 

2018 films
2018 drama films
French drama films
2010s French-language films
2010s French films